East Cooyar is a rural locality in the Toowoomba Region, Queensland, Australia.

History 
The locality takes its name form the town, which in turn takes its name from Cooyar Creek, which in turn is believed to be a corruption of the Waka word kuiyum, kuya or kuiyur meaning fire.

References 

Toowoomba Region
Localities in Queensland